Admiral Sir Frederick George Denham Bedford,  (24 December 1838 – 30 January 1913) was a senior Royal Navy officer and Governor of Western Australia from 24 March 1903 to 22 April 1909.

Naval career
Bedford was born on 24 December 1838, and joined the Royal Navy at the age of 14. He later served in the Crimean War.

Bedford was appointed Commander-in-Chief, Cape of Good Hope and West Coast of Africa Station in 1892: in 1894, Bedford was involved in an action against Nana Olomu Chief of Benin. Brohomi was burnt down in 1894 by a combined force of the British Naval Brigade and the Niger Coast Protectorate Force under Bedford and the Consul-General Ralph Moor. It is believed over 500–600 slaves were freed during the operation. On 22 February 1895, a British naval force, under the command of Bedford at the behest of the Royal Niger Company, granted a royal charter by Queen Victoria in 1886, laid siege on Brass, the chief city of the Ljo people of Nembe in Nigeria's Niger Delta.

Bedford was appointed Junior Naval Lord in 1889 and Second Naval Lord in 1895.

In 1899 Bedford was appointed commander-in-chief of the North America and West Indies Station, serving with the flagship . The squadron under his command visited Jamaica and Bermuda in February 1900. He held the North America post until 15 July 1902, when he was succeeded by Vice Admiral Sir Archibald Douglas, and left homebound with the Crescent.

Following the succession of King Edward VII, Bedford was advanced to Knight Grand Cross of the Order of the Bath in the 1902 Coronation Honours published on 26 June 1902, and received the insignia in an investiture on board the royal yacht Victoria and Albert outside Cowes on 15 August 1902, the day before the fleet review held there to mark the coronation. Bedford took part in the review with the Crescent, before the ship was paid off. He was promoted to the rank of admiral on 3 October 1902.

Governor of Western Australia
Bedford was appointed Governor of Western Australia in 1903. On 4 June 1907 he officiated at the opening of the Royal Fremantle Golf Club in Western Australia, but it was not until March 1909 that the complete 18 hole course was available.

Bedford acquired Globe Hill Station with Thomas Frederick de Pledge in 1909 for £35,000.

Memorials
A memorial to Bedford stands in the entrance lobby of the Chapel at Greenwich Hospital, London.

Family

Bedford married Ethel Turner, daughter of E. R. Turner, of Ipswich, in 1880. Lady Bedford accompanied her husband and was mistress of Admiralty House in Halifax, Nova Scotia, until 1902. She took an interest in benevolent work, and frequently performed as a singer at concerts, for charitable purposes.

The couple's son was Vice Admiral Sir Arthur Edward Frederick Bedford, who married Miss Gladys Mort of Sydney, Australia. While residing at Easthampnett, their son Frederick, named after his grandfather, who had become a lieutenant in the Fleet Air Arm, was killed in action over St Pauls Bay, Malta on 21 February 1942, aged 22 years, and was buried in Capuccini Naval Cemetery in Kalkara, Malta.

Legacy
Two suburbs of Perth are named after Bedford – Bedford (located in the City of Bayswater) and Bedfordale (located in the City of Armadale). Additionally, a pastoral lease in the Kimberley, Bedford Downs Station, is named after Bedford, as is nearby Mount Bedford.

Affiliations
TS Bedford, Australian Navy Cadets – (Former Unit)

Notes

External links

|-

|-

|-

|-

1838 births
1913 deaths
Royal Navy admirals
Royal Navy personnel of the Crimean War
Governors of Western Australia
Knights Grand Cross of the Order of the Bath
Knights Grand Cross of the Royal Victorian Order
Lords of the Admiralty
People from colonial Nigeria